Horneridae is a family of bryozoans belonging to the order Cyclostomatida.

Genera:
 Eohornera Brood, 1972
 Filicavea d'Orbigny, 1853
 Frontohornera Grischenko, Gordon & Melnik, 2018
 Hornera Lamouroux, 1821
 Siphodictyum Lonsdale, 1849
 Spinihornera Brood, 1979

References

Cyclostomatida